Benjamin Verraes (born 21 February 1987 in Menin) is a Belgian cyclist, who rides for Belgian amateur team Projectbouw Borgonjon–Pessemier NV.

Major results

2010
 2nd Overall Tour du Loir-et-Cher
 3rd Val d'Ille U Classic 35
 5th Kattekoers
 9th Grote Prijs Stad Geel
 9th Memorial Rik Van Steenbergen
2011
 1st Gooikse Pijl
 2nd Kattekoers
 5th Memorial Van Coningsloo
 6th Overall Le Triptyque des Monts et Châteaux
 6th Nokere Koerse
 7th Grand Prix de la ville de Pérenchies
2012
 2nd Memorial Van Coningsloo
 3rd Val d'Ille U Classic 35
 3rd Grote Prijs Stad Geel
 4th Kattekoers
 6th Grand Prix de la ville de Pérenchies
 6th De Kustpijl
 10th Overall Le Triptyque des Monts et Châteaux
 10th Overall World Ports Classic
2014
 1st  Time trial, National Amateur Road Championships
2015
 9th Ronde van Limburg
2016
 9th Ronde van Overijssel

References

External links

1987 births
Living people
Belgian male cyclists
People from Menen
Cyclists from West Flanders